The Mapogo lion coalition was a band of male South African lions that controlled the Sabi Sand region in Kruger National Park. It is believed the Mapogos killed in excess of 40 lions and cubs in a little over a year. The statistics may be higher given their coverage of such large territories. At its peak, the coalition consisted of six males: the leader Makulu (also spelled as Makhulu), Rasta, Scar, Pretty Boy, Kinky Tail and Mr. T.

History 
The Mapogo coalition originated from Mala Mala from what was called the “Eyrefield Pride” (Sparta Pride) and moved into the Western Sector in 2006.  The Mapogo lions followed a recent trend in the Sabi Sand Reserve of mega pride male lion coalitions.  The five related brothers were sired by a similar mega pride coalition of five male lions.  In their quest to dominate the area, the six lions killed approximately 40 other lions which included many cubs, females, and rival adult males.

The oldest Mapogo male, Makulu, is believed to be unrelated to the other five lions. The story is that the original Sparta pride lost a male sub-adult of 20 to 21 months of age in May/June 2000 and in July 2000, this male of about the same age latched on to the original pride. As a result, Makulu was naturally bigger in size than his fellow brothers. Though not readily accepted by the lionesses, the West Street Males tolerated him and didn't kill him, even though typically, intruding males of his age would be chased off or killed. Field experts believe a likely reason for his acceptance into the pride was because he may have been the offspring of one of the West Street Males and a lioness from another pride (therefore making him the Mapogos' half brother).

In the first months of 2006, the five subadult lions and Makulu left their pride.  They now had to fight for themselves, but by sticking together they increased their survival chances.  Whilst living among themselves, the lions learned to be successful hunters. As they grew in size and experience, they were able to take down large prey such as hippos, young rhinos, and even giraffes.  According to Dave Salmoni, successfully taking down cape buffalo was their "key to success".  During the buffalo hunts, Kinky Tail (also called Shaka) and Mr. T (also called Satan) were often observed being more aggressive in bringing down the buffalo.

Rise of the Mapogo coalition
The Mapogos first pride clash was in 2006.  The Mapogo lions entered the northern Sabi Sand, which was ruled by four dominant males.  Immediately upon arrival, the Mapogos managed to kill one of the males, and the remaining three were driven off.  With the Ottawa pride's male lion driven off, three lionesses and 11 cubs remained.  Due to the male lion's natural instincts, the six Mapogos quickly found and killed all 11 Ottawa cubs, with reports of Mr. T even eating some of the cubs, despite cannibalistic behavior in lions being uncommon.

With all competition eliminated, the Mapogos had successfully controlled eight prides.  They were the dominant male coalition of Sabi Sand and killed more than 100 lions from the neighbouring prides during their rule.

Territorial expansion

Mr. T and Kinky Tail were then seen patrolling and guarding their territory for two years, managing to fight off other rival lions.  However, in June 2010, a coalition of five male lions named the Majingilanes entered in Mapogo territory to take over.  The five males were witnessed scent-marking and roaring loudly near the Mapogo's territory.  In a buffalo hunt, Kinky Tail and Mr. T were able to isolate the youngest of Majingilane males who was on lookout and began chasing him. Soon they caught the intruder and Mr. T bit down on the male's neck, Kinky Tail ripped apart the male's groin area inflicting tears and bleeding. The Majingilane male tried to fight back.  Eventually Kinky Tail and Mr. T managed to break the 5th Majingilane lion's spine and he was left immobilized and left to die a few hours later.

Kinky Tail's death 
Later that same night, a filming crew witnessed the four remaining younger Majingilane lions on the move. Two of them were exposed to Kinky Tail, who immediately charged on them all by himself. They ran with KT on their tail, and the remaining two Majingilane lions came up behind KT. Without the experience of being afraid of anything, Kinky Tail attacked all four of them by himself. Eventually on a dirt road, under a cloud of dust, the four Majingilanes had pinned down Kinky Tail. The four males immediately started to bite and rip apart Kinky Tail. One lion was biting at his neck, another at his back; the third bit off Kinky Tail's testicles and genitalia. The Majingilanes managed to successfully snap Kinky Tail's spine, thus immobilizing him and leaving him with zero chance of survival. Mr. T eventually arrived and attempted to rescue and fight off the Majingilanes, but was outnumbered and outmaneuvered and forced to flee. Two Majingilanes attempted to track Mr. T, but were unsuccessful and returned to kill Kinky Tail. The four lions had started eating most of Kinky Tail's hind legs and his entire tail. He was seen taking his last breath while being eaten alive. During the altercation, Mr. T attempted again to save his brother.

The last remaining Mapogos, Makulu and Pretty Boy had to leave their territory to Selatis, fought a coalition of two Kruger males (Freddy and Limper) to occupy their territory and were driven off their territory. One of the Kruger males (Limper) later died due to injuries from Makulu. They were sighted in 2012 side by side, entering the Kruger National Park through the gate attributed to Paul Kruger. The remaining two were once again seen feeding on a buffalo in October–November 2012. In January 2013, Makulu was seen for the last time alone at Mala Mala, neighboring his old haunt, the Sabi Sand Reserve. At this point, he was almost 15 years old and largely exceeded the average male lion life expectancy.

In film 
Daniel Huertas directed the documentary Brothers in Blood: The Lions of Sabi Sand, which was released in 2015 in the UK. The documentary summarized the 16-year span of the rise and eventual fall of the Mapogo coalition. The documentary aired as an eight-episode series in the United States on Animal Planet.

References

Individual lions
Kruger National Park
History of South Africa
Panthera leo melanochaita